The 1934 Tennessee gubernatorial election was held on November 6, 1934. Incumbent Democrat Hill McAlister defeated Independent Lewis S. Pope with 61.78% of the vote.

Primary elections
Primary elections were held on August 2, 1934.

Democratic primary

Candidates
Hill McAlister, incumbent Governor
Lewis S. Pope

Results

General election

Candidates
Hill McAlister, Democratic
Lewis S. Pope, Independent

Results

References

1934
Tennessee
Gubernatorial